Frederick Currey was a rugby union international who represented England in 1872.

Early life
Frederick Currey was born on 3 May 1849 in Kent. He attended Marlborough College.

Rugby union career
Currey made his international debut on 5 February 1872 at The Oval in the England vs Scotland match.

References

1849 births
1896 deaths
English rugby union players
England international rugby union players
Rugby union forwards
Place of birth missing
People educated at Marlborough College
Rugby union players from Kent